Rapistrum, the bastardcabbages, is a genus of the family Brassicaceae with a distinctive cross like arrangement of its petals. Species of Rapistrum are annual to perennials (Lifespan from 1 to 2 or more years). The yellow petals are accompanied by sepals that stand vertically at near right angles (erecto-patent). Leaf shape and arrangement varies from rough toothed (dentate) to a configuration of opposingly lobed pairs along the plant stalk, pinnately lobed.

Fruit
The genus Rapistrum has a characteristic fruit comprising two segments:

a)  The distal  (upper division)
The part of the fruit farthest away from the point of attachment. The distal is endowed with a ribbed spheroid base (globose) that tapers to form a narrowed projection. It holds a single seed.

b) The proximal (lower division)
The part of the fruit nearest to the point of attachment. Possesses a more uniform narrower shape compared to the distal above, giving the fruit a waist. It holds a maximum of three seeds, more commonly none or one.

The fruit varies from species to species. The distal of R. rugosum is strongly ribbed and narrows to form a beak whereas R. perenne is comparatively less wrinkled and ends with a style that stubbornly resists detachment, 'a persistent style'.

When ripe the distal breaks away in an across-wise fashion, breaking transversely.

References

.
.

Brassicaceae
Brassicaceae genera